Lacena "Candy" Carson (née Rustin; born August 19, 1953) is an American author and businesswoman. She is married to former Secretary of Housing and Urban Development and retired neurosurgeon Benjamin Carson and co-founded the Carson Scholars Fund.  Alongside her husband, she is the co-author of four books. During her husband's run for the 2016 Republican nomination for President of the United States, Carson was active on the campaign trail doing TV appearances and solo live campaign appearances.

Early life and education
Born Lacena Rustin on August 19, 1953, in Royal Oak Township, Michigan. Carson was raised in the Episcopal Church by her mother. She graduated from Ferndale High School.  Carson met her future husband, also a Detroit native, in the 1970s when both were students at Yale University.

Following her graduation from Yale, Carson attended Johns Hopkins Carey Business School where she earned her MBA.

A former concert violinist, Carson performed the National Anthem during her husband’s campaign kick-off. She has been a conductor for the University of Maryland Medical Center Chamber Players.

Career
In the Baltimore area, Carson worked in real estate, trust administration and insurance.

Carson Scholars Fund 

In 1994, Carson and her husband started the Carson Scholars Fund, designed to provide scholarships to students in grades 4–11 for "academic excellence and humanitarian qualities". The foundation was started after the Carsons read that U.S. students ranked second to last in terms of math and science testing among 22 countries, feeling that their efforts could assist in encouraging academic efforts as they noted schools award athletes with trophies whereas honor students received only "a pin or certificate".  Recipients of the Carson Scholars Fund receive a $1,000 scholarship towards their college education and has awarded upward of 6,700 scholarships.

Carson is the facilitator of the scholarship fund.

Personal life
Carson and her husband married in 1975.  Together, they have three sons: Murray, Benjamin Jr., and Rhoeyce, as well as several grandchildren. Until 2013, the couple lived in West Friendship, Maryland and then relocated to Florida. Both she and her husband are long-time members of the Seventh-day Adventist Church.  In line with her religious beliefs, Carson is a vegetarian.

In 1981 Carson became pregnant with twins before miscarrying in the fifth month of her pregnancy. After this experience, when she became pregnant again in the following year, Carson was placed on bed rest by her doctor after the fourth month. She left her job and took this time to focus on self-care for the remainder of her pregnancy.

Portrayal in popular media
Carson was portrayed by Aunjanue Ellis in the TNT made-for-TV movie Gifted Hands: The Ben Carson Story (first airdate February 7, 2009), starring Cuba Gooding, Jr. She starred as herself in the 1991 biographical documentary about her husband, Gifted Hands.

She was portrayed by Leslie Jones on the Saturday March 10, 2018, episode of Saturday Night Live.

In the news
Carson received criticism for reportedly pressuring her husband's staff to spend up to $31,000 on a dining set in his Housing and Urban Development office in late 2017. This was discovered after Helen Foster, a career HUD official, filed a complaint alleging that she was demoted from her position because she refused to spend more than the legal $5,000 limit for office redecoration.

Publications 
Carson has co-authored four books with her husband, including One Nation, which made The New York Times Best Seller list and spent five weeks at #1. Her memoir A Doctor in the House: My Life with Ben Carson was released at the beginning of 2016.

Books, with Ben Carson 
 .
 .
 
 .

References

External links
Candy Carson at IMDb

1953 births
21st-century American writers
21st-century American women writers
American Seventh-day Adventists
Christian vegetarianism
Protestant writers
Florida Republicans
Johns Hopkins Carey Business School alumni
Living people
Maryland Republicans
Michigan Republicans
Seventh-day Adventists from Michigan
Writers from Detroit
Yale College alumni